Hangmans Run is a  long 1st order tributary to Appoquinimink River in New Castle County, Delaware.

Variant names
According to the Geographic Names Information System, it has also been known historically as:  
Damascus Creek

Course
Hangmans Run rises on the Beaver Branch divide about 0.25 miles northeast of Fieldsboro in New Castle County, Delaware.  Hangmans Run then flows northeast to meet the Appoquinimink River about 0.5 miles southeast of Thomas Landing, Delaware.

Watershed
Hangmans Run drains  of area, receives about 43.2 in/year of precipitation, has a topographic wetness index of 612.35 and is about 5.5% forested.

See also
List of rivers of Delaware

References 

Rivers of Delaware
Rivers of New Castle County, Delaware
Tributaries of Delaware Bay